The State Museum of the History of Saint Petersburg is a museum of the history of the city of Saint Petersburg, Russia.

The headquarters of the museum are located in the Peter and Paul Fortress. It became the City Museum in 1918, and then the Museum of History and Development of Leningrad in 1938. In 1951 it was renamed the Museum of Architecture of Leningrad, and in 1953 it became the State Museum of the History of Leningrad.

During the Second World War, following the Axis invasion of the Soviet Union, the museum's contents were evacuated to Sarapul.  The first full historical exhibitions began in 1957, celebrating the 250th anniversary of Leningrad. By 2002 the museum's collections had grown to 1 million objects, and included architects' documents, photos and plans of Saint Petersburg from the 18th–20th centuries.

See also
 List of museums in Saint Petersburg

References

Saint Petersburg Encyclopedia

Museums established in 1938
City museums
Local history museums in Russia
Peter and Paul Fortress
History museums in Saint Petersburg